Truth Initiative (formerly the American Legacy Foundation or Legacy) is a nonprofit tobacco control organization "dedicated to achieving a culture where all youth and young adults reject tobacco." It was established in March 1999 as a result of the Tobacco Master Settlement Agreement between the attorneys general of 46 states, the District of Columbia and five United States territories, and the tobacco industry. Truth Initiative is best known for its youth smoking prevention campaign. Its other primary aims include conducting tobacco control research and policy studies, organizing community and youth engagement programs and developing digital cessation and prevention products, including through revenue-generating models.  The organization changed its name from the American Legacy Foundation to Truth Initiative on September 8, 2015, to better align with its Truth campaign.  As of 2016, the organization had more than $957 million in assets and a staff of 133 based primarily in its Washington, D.C., office.

History 
Truth Initiative was founded in 1999 as a result of the Tobacco Master Settlement Agreement (MSA).  The MSA was announced in 1998, resolving the lawsuits brought by 46 U.S. states, the District of Columbia and five territories against the major U.S. cigarette companies, to recover state Medicaid and other costs from caring for sick smokers.  The four other states settled separately.  The tobacco industry agreed to pay the states billions of dollars in perpetuity, making the MSA the then-largest civil litigation settlement in U.S. history.  The states directed that a portion of the money they received from the settlement should be used to establish a national public health foundation dedicated to prevent youth smoking and helping smokers quit: the American Legacy Foundation, now Truth Initiative.

In 2018, the Truth Initiative partnered with Office of National Drug Control Policy and the Ad Council to combat opioid addiction.

Activities

Truth Campaign 

Truth Initiative's signature program is its Truth campaign, a youth smoking prevention mass media public education program that has been widely credited with contributing to a significant drop in teen smoking.  In 2000, 23% of American 8th, 10th and 12th graders smoked.  As of 2016, that figure was 6%.  The campaign exposes tobacco industry practices as well as the health effects and social consequences of smoking.

Truth Initiative Schroeder Institute 
Researchers in the Truth Initiative Schroeder Institute publish dozens of peer-reviewed research articles each year with the goal of identifying methods to minimize the harms of tobacco use, measure the effectiveness of interventions and identify best practices for tobacco control.  Research is also done to assess the Truth campaign's efforts, both pre-and post-market, including the use of the longitudinal Truth Longitudinal Cohort (TLC) survey of more than 10,000 young people and a continuous tracking study to assess campaign awareness and message receptivity.

In the early 2000s the American Legacy Foundation (as the Truth Initiative was then known) gave around $10 million of the settlement funds it managed to the University of California San Francisco (USCF) to help it formalize and expand the collection of internal tobacco industry documents that its library already hosted; the collection was then named the Legacy Tobacco Documents Library.  As of May 2017, the library contained 14.7 million internal documents (nearly 89 million pages) created by major tobacco companies related to their advertising, manufacturing, marketing, sales and scientific research activities.

Community and Youth Engagement 
Truth Initiative provides individuals, coalitions, and organizations information and methods to reduce tobacco use in their communities.  The organization trains and educates young people interested in tobacco control and partners with community-serving organizations to reduce tobacco use.  This includes a grant program for community colleges and historically black colleges and universities to create tobacco-free campuses.

Examples of youth activism programs include:
 National Summit on Youth Activism: A training program for high school students that provides activism strategies, media training and approaches to community engagement
 Youth Activism Fellowship: A year-long training program for young adults that prepares participants to carry out a tobacco control project in his or her community
These community engagement programs are often an "on the ground" extension of the Truth campaign's work.  Supporters of the campaign are called upon to support other anti-tobacco issues, such as a 2017 rally outside a Walgreens shareholders meeting in New York that was organized to pressure the pharmacy's board of directors to stop selling tobacco in its stores.

Innovations 
The innovations center within Truth Initiative designs, builds and markets digital smoking cessation and prevention products that are centered around online social networks, text messaging and web and mobile applications.  Any revenue generated by the innovations programs helps support other work at the organization.

Examples of these programs include:

 BecomeAnEX: Created in 2008, BecomeAnEX is a free online resource for individuals who want to quit smoking.  Its website hosts a community forum and features blogs written by other smokers and ex-smokers that discuss quit strategies, challenges and successes.  In addition to the online community, the site offers cessation tools, counseling, medication information and other cessation support services.
 EX Program: Launched in 2017 in collaboration with Mayo Clinic, the EX Program is a digital quit smoking program based on BecomeAnEx that health systems, health plans and employers can purchase and offer to their employees and members.
 This Is Quitting: Designed for young adults, This Is Quitting is a mobile app that relays evidence-based text messages and other user-generated content to assist users in the process of quitting smoking.

Leadership

Staff 
Truth Initiative is led by a senior leadership team with representatives from each of its functional program areas.  Headed by CEO and President Robin Koval, this team includes:

 Eric Asche, chief marketing officer
 Derrick A. Butts, chief information officer
 Dave Dobbins, chief operating officer
 Amanda L. Graham, chief of innovations
 Tricia Kenney, chief communications officer
 Anthony O'Toole, chief financial & investment officer
 Anna M. Spriggs, chief of human resources & administration
 Amy Taylor, chief of community engagement
 Donna Vallone, chief research officer, Truth Initiative Schroeder Institute
 Robert Falk, general counsel

Board of Directors

Awards and recognition 
In addition to awards for its Truth campaign, including being named among the top 10 ad campaigns of the 21st century, Truth Initiative has also been recognized with the following:

 2017 Alliance for Workplace Excellence Health & Wellness Seal of Approval
 2017 honoree, Center for Positive Organizations' Positive Business Project
 2017 Inc. magazine top 10 Washington, D.C. companies with the coolest perks
 2016 North American Effie Index top five most effective marketer
 2013 Telly Awards Online Video Silver Telly and Bronze Telly
 2012 PRWeek Awards In-House PR Team of the Year honorable mention
 2012 Nonprofit PR Awards Annual Publication or Brochure honorable mention
 2012 PR Daily Awards Best Annual Report (Print) honorable mention
 2012 Hermes Creative Awards Platinum Award - Publications/Annual Report and PR Campaign
 2010 Communicator Awards Award of Excellence - Integrated Campaign
 2005 Latino Marketing Awards - Public Relations Public Education Program

See also

 Truth

References

External links 
 Truth Initiative
 Truth
 BecomeAnEX
 EX Program
 This is Quitting
 Schroeder Institute for Tobacco Research and Policy Studies
 UCSF Tobacco Industry Videos Collection
 UCSF Tobacco Industry Audio Recordings Collection

Tobacco control
Smoking in the United States
501(c)(3) organizations
1998 establishments in the United States